Robert Alan Sale (born July 1, 1979) is an American football coach who is the offensive coordinator for the Florida Gators of the NCAA (SEC). He previously served as an assistant coach at the University of Louisiana at Lafayette, Arizona State University, University of Louisiana at Monroe, University of Georgia, McNeese State University, University of Alabama, and the New York Giants.

Playing career 
Sale was an offensive lineman at LSU from 1998 to 2002, where he was a three-year starter at both guard positions and center.

Coaching career

Catholic HS of Pointe Coupee
Sale began his coaching career in 2006 at Catholic High School of Pointe Coupee in Louisiana as their offensive line coach.

Alabama
Sale was hired as a strength & conditioning assistant and offensive analyst at Alabama in 2007 under his former college coach Nick Saban.

McNeese State
Sale served as the offensive line coach at McNeese State from 2012 to 2014 and later added the title of co-offensive coordinator in 2014.

Georgia
Sale was named the offensive line coach at Georgia in 2015. Sale was not retained after the season following the termination of Mark Richt. In 2016, Sale joined as the offensive line coach at Louisiana–Monroe.

Arizona State
Sale joined the coaching staff at Arizona State in 2017 as their offensive line coach and running game coordinator, working under Sun Devils offensive coordinator Billy Napier, who he met when they were offensive analysts at Alabama.

Louisiana
When Napier was named the head coach at Louisiana in 2017, Sale followed him to Lafayette to be the Ragin' Cajuns offensive coordinator and offensive line coach.

New York Giants
On March 10, 2021, Sale was hired by the New York Giants as their offensive line coach under head coach Joe Judge.

Florida 
On January 11, 2022, Sale was hired by Florida as their offensive coordinator and offensive line coach under head coach Billy Napier.

Personal life 
Born in Monroe, Louisiana, Sale's family has owned a store since 1946, and has sold LSU items since 2000. Sale and his wife Amanda have two sons, Tripp and Briggs.

References

External links 
 Louisiana Ragin' Cajuns bio
 Arizona State Sun Devils bio

1979 births
Living people
Sportspeople from Monroe, Louisiana
Players of American football from Louisiana
American football offensive guards
American football centers
LSU Tigers football players
High school football coaches in Louisiana
Alabama Crimson Tide football coaches
McNeese Cowboys football coaches
Georgia Bulldogs football coaches
Louisiana–Monroe Warhawks football coaches
Arizona State Sun Devils football coaches
Louisiana Ragin' Cajuns football coaches
New York Giants coaches